The 1946 Michigan gubernatorial election was held on November 5, 1946. Republican nominee Kim Sigler defeated Democratic nominee Murray Van Wagoner with 60.28% of the vote. 

Sigler was the last Republican to carry Wayne County until William Milliken did so in 1978.

General election

Candidates
Major party candidates
Kim Sigler, Republican
Murray Van Wagoner, Democratic
Other candidates
Seth A. Davey, Prohibition
Theos A. Grove, Socialist Labor

Results

Primaries
The primary elections occurred on June 18, 1946.

Republican primary

Democratic primary

References

1946
Michigan
Gubernatorial
November 1946 events in the United States